Tonny van Ede (22 December 192417 February 2011) was a Dutch football player.

Club career
Van Ede was a product of the Sparta Rotterdam youth system, joining the club at 11 and making his senior debut in 1947. During the Second World War he was sent to work in Germany but fled to England, where he became a member of the Princess Irene Brigade. He won the 1959 Dutch league title with Sparta and in the next season was part of the first Dutch football team that made it to the European Cup quarter finals. He scored the only goal in an away win at Rangers but Sparta was eliminated on away goals, having lost the home leg 2-3.

In 1962 he won the KNVB Cup with Sparta.

International career
Van Ede also played for the Netherlands in friendly matches against Belgium and Norway in April and September 1953.

Retirement
After retiring, van Ede was named honorary member of Sparta and in 2010 the main stand at the Sparta stadium was named after him.

He died on 17 February 2011 at the age of 86.

References

External links

 Bio - Sparta Rotterdam 
 Bio - In the Mood 
 Dutch league stats - Voetbal International

1924 births
2011 deaths
Footballers from Rotterdam
Association football wingers
Dutch footballers
Netherlands international footballers
Sparta Rotterdam players
Eredivisie players